This is a listing of the horses that finished in first, second, and third place (and the number of starters) in the Gold Cup at Santa Anita Stakes (formerly the Hollywood Gold Cup), an American Grade 1 race for three-year-olds and up at 1 1/4 miles on dirt (except 2007-2013 when on the synthetic surface, 'Cushion Track'). Since 2014, it has been held at Santa Anita Park in Arcadia, California; earlier runnings were held at Hollywood Park.  (List - 1938 to Present)

References 

Horse races in California
Hollywood Park Racetrack
Santa Anita Park
Grade 1 stakes races in the United States
Open middle distance horse races
Graded stakes races in the United States